d.b.s. were a punk rock band from North Vancouver, British Columbia, Canada. From their beginnings in 1992 to their eventual breakup in 2001, they gained popularity in the Canadian punk rock scene, and to a lesser extent, the U.S. punk rock scene.

During their decade-long career, they released five studio albums, and toured with many well-established punk rock bands such as Rancid, Anti-Flag, D.O.A., Bouncing Souls, Youth Brigade, and many more. Their music drew comparisons to Jawbreaker, Lifetime, and The Promise Ring, among others.

History 

The band formed in 1992, when they were only in grade 8, consisting at the time of Andy Dixon, Jesse Gander, Paul Patko, and Dhani Borges. The first songs they played together were covers of The Ramones ("I Believe in Miracles") and Stevie Wonder ("Higher Ground").  They were in grade 11 when they released their first full-length, Tales from the Crib—a pun of Tales from the Crypt, in reference to the band's youth.  They went on their first tour that same year, traveling to California with fellow Vancouver punk band Gob.

Their musical career concluded with their final release, Forget Everything You Know.  After the release of this EP, they disbanded, and went on to other projects.

Members 
 Jesse Gander − vocals
 Andy Dixon − guitar, backing vocals
 Paul Patko − drums, backing vocals
 Dhani Borges − bass (left sometime after recording I Is for Insignificant)
 Ryan Angus (Nordburg) − bass (replaced Dhani in January 1998)

Discography

Self-released 
 Selfexploditory (Cassette) – (1992)
 Lighten Up (Cassette) – (1993)
 Catch 22 (Cassette) – (1993)

Full lengths 
 Tales from the Crib − Nefer Records (1995)
 If the Music's Loud Enough… − Nefer Records (1996)
 I Is for Insignificant − Sudden Death Records (1998)
 Some Boys Got It, Most Men Don't − New Disorder Records (1999)
 If Life Were a Result, We'd All Be Dead − Crap Records (2000)

EPs and singles 
 "Snowball's Rollin' Fine" (7") – Nefer Records (1995)
 When the Meek Get Pinched the Bold Survive (7") – Crap Records (1997)
 Forget Everything You Know (EP) − Ache Records (2001)

Split releases 
 North America Sucks!! (Split album with Anti-Flag) – Nefer Records (1996)
 D.O.A./d.b.s. Split (7") – Empty Records
 The Cost/d.b.s. Split (7") – Sellout Records (2000)

Other projects 
 The Red Light Sting  − A post-hardcore/art punk band formed as a side-project for d.b.s., with Andy Dixon on guitar and Paul Patko on drums. Now defunct.
 Operation Makeout  − Formed in 1999, with Jesse Gander later replacing original member Lee Evernden on bass and vocals.
 Secret Mommy  − Andy Dixon's glitch/indietronica music.
 Winning  − A band which includes Andy Dixon on vocals, guitar and piano, and Paul Patko on drums and percussion.
 Ghost House  - Piano-driven post-punk band fronted by Jesse Gander.  Toured and released one album, Departures, on Reluctant Recordings .
 Opus Arise - 8-piece Symphonic Metal featuring Paul Patko on drums.

References

External links 
  − defunct for several years
 Ache Records

Canadian punk rock groups
Musical groups established in 1992
Musical groups disestablished in 2001
Musical groups from British Columbia
1992 establishments in British Columbia
2001 disestablishments in British Columbia